Roderick Hugh McLeod (22 December 1862 – 26 November 1924) was an Australian politician.

He was born in Daylesford to Donald McLeod and Annie Rennie. He was a teacher and journalist, having graduated with a Bachelor of Arts from the University of Melbourne. He taught at Wesley College and was also a sporting coach at Melbourne University. Around 1885 he married Molly Heffernan, with whom he had one son. In 1923 he contested a by-election for the Victorian Legislative Assembly seat of Daylesford, which had been vacated on his father's death. Running as a Nationalist candidate, he was initially defeated by the Labor candidate James McDonald, but was then declared elected after a recount. He lost his seat to McDonald at the 1924 state election, and died later that year at South Yarra.

References

1862 births
1924 deaths
Nationalist Party of Australia members of the Parliament of Victoria
Members of the Victorian Legislative Assembly
People from Daylesford, Victoria